The Dani people (also spelled Ndani) are a people from the Central Highlands of Western New Guinea in Baliem Valley, Highland Papua, Indonesia. They are sometimes conflated with the Lani group to the west.

They are one of the most populous tribes in the highlands, and are found spread out through the highlands. The Dani are one of the best-known ethnic groups in Papua, due to the relatively numerous tourists who visit the Baliem Valley area where they predominate. "Ndani" is the name given to the Baliem Valley people by the Moni people, and while they call themselves "Hubula", they have been known as Dani since the 1926 Smithsonian Institution-Dutch Colonial Government expedition to New Guinea under Matthew Stirling who visited the Moni.

Language
Linguists identify at least four sub-groupings of Dani languages: 
 Lower-Grand Valley Dani (20,000 speakers)
 Mid-Grand Valley Dani (50,000 speakers)
 Upper-Grand Valley Dani (20,000 speakers)
 and the Lani or Western Dani (180,000 speakers)

The Dani languages differentiate only two basic colours, mili for cool/dark shades such as blue, green, and black, and mola for warm/light colours such as red, yellow, and white. This trait makes it an interesting field of research for language psychologists, e.g. Eleanor Rosch, eager to know whether there is a link between way of thought and language.

First contact
A small fringe group of the Dani, living south of Puncak Trikora and presenting themselves as the Pesegem and the Horip tribes, were met on 29 October 1909,  by the Second South New Guinea Expedition led by Hendrikus Albertus Lorentz, who stayed several nights in their village. First contact with the populous Western Dani was made in October 1920 during the Central New Guinea Expedition, which group of explorers stayed  for six months with them at their farms in the upper Swart River Valley (now Toli Valley). The Grand Valley was only sighted on 23 June 1938 from a PBY Catalina by Richard Archbold, who stumbled upon the valley while studying high altitude vegetations in Jayawijaya Mountains.

The first white people to live among the Dani were John and Helen Dekker, under whose ministry the Christian population among the Dani grew to 13,000.

Culture

Sweet potatoes are important in their local culture, being the most important tool used in bartering, especially in dowries. Likewise pig feasts are extremely important to celebrate events communally; the success of a feast, and that of a village big man (man of influence) or organiser, is often gauged by the number of pigs slaughtered.

The Dani use an earth oven method of cooking pig and their staple crops such as sweet potato, banana, and cassava. They heat some stones in a fire until they are extremely hot, then wrap cuts of meat and pieces of sweet potato or banana inside banana leaves. The food package is then lowered into a pit which has been lined with some of the hot stones described above, the remaining hot stones are then placed on top, and the pit is covered in grass and a cover to keep steam in. After a couple of hours the pit is opened and the food removed and eaten. Pigs are too valuable to be served regularly, and are reserved for special occasions only.

Ritual small-scale warfare between rival villages was an integral part to traditional Dani culture, with much time spent preparing weapons and treating resulting injuries. Typically the emphasis in battle is to insult the enemy and wound or kill token victims, as opposed to capturing territory or property or vanquishing the enemy village. Such fighting is no longer done.

Ethnographic studies 
In 1961, as a member of the Harvard-Peabody study, filmmaker Robert Gardner began recording the Dani of the Baliem River Valley. In 1965, he created the film Dead Birds from this experience. Gardner emphasizes the themes of death and people-as-birds in Dani culture. "Dead birds" or "dead men" are terms the Dani use for the weapons and ornaments taken from the enemy during battle (wim). These trophies are displayed during the two-day dance of victory (edai) after an enemy is killed.

See also

Indigenous people of New Guinea

References

Further reading
 Gardner, Robert. (1968). Gardens of War: Life and Death in the New Guinea Stone Age. New York: Random House.
 Heider, Karl G. (1970). The Dugum Dani: A Papuan Culture in the Highlands of West New Guinea. Aldine Publishing.
 Heider, Karl G. (1996). Grand Valley Dani: Peaceful Warriors (Case Studies in Cultural Anthropology). Wadsworth Publishing (3rd ed.).
 Matthiessen, Peter. (1962). Under the Mountain Wall: A Chronicle of Two Seasons in Stone Age New Guinea. Viking Press. 
 Monbiot, George. (1989). Poisoned Arrows: An Investigative Journey Through Indonesia. Abacus 
 Zuckoff, Mitchell. (2011). Lost in Shangri-La: A True Story of Survival, Adventure, and the Most Incredible Rescue Mission of World War II. Harper 
 Arbay, Evi Aryati (2014). "Dani The Highlander (Manusia Pegunungan)". Self Publisher by Evi Aryati Arbay.  (UK),  (Indonesia)
 Park, Michael Allen (2014) "Peaceful Warriors and Cannibal Farmers" in Introducing Anthropology an Integrated Approach (New York: McGraw Hill)14:343

External links

 Extensive English language library, some material written by Lani (highland) tribespeople 
 SIL Ethnologue on Papua, Indonesia
 Expeditions to West Papua
 Outline of Dani Morphology 
 Baliem Valley Culture Festival

Ethnic groups in Indonesia
Indigenous ethnic groups in Western New Guinea
Articles containing video clips